The Summit League women's basketball tournament has existed since 1993.  The winner of the tournament receives the Summit League's automatic bid into the NCAA Women's Division I Basketball Championship.

The Summit League was known as the Association of Mid-Continent Universities (AMCU) from 1982–1989 and Mid-Continent Conference from 1989–2007.

Tournament champions

Tournament wins by school

 Teams in bold are currently in the Summit League. Oral Roberts left for the Southland Conference after the 2011–12 season, but returned for 2014–15.
 Among current Summit League members, Denver, Kansas City, and Omaha have reached the tournament final but failed to win the championship, while North Dakota and North Dakota State have yet to advance to the tournament final. Kansas City, which rejoined in 2020–21, had competed under its academic identity of UMKC during its previous Summit tenure (1994–95 to 2012–13).

Tournament locations

See also
 Summit League men's basketball tournament

References